Balapuwaduge Kusal Gimhan Mendis, generally known as  Kusal Mendis is a professional Sri Lankan cricketer who plays as a top-order batter in all forms of the game. He only played sixteen first-class matches before playing for the national side. In November 2017, he was named the One Day International (ODI) batsman of the year for the 2016–17 season at Sri Lanka Cricket's annual awards.

Early and domestic career
Mendis was adjudged the 2013 schoolboy cricketer of the year and had captained the national youth and the Prince of Wales College, Moratuwa teams in his formative years.

In March 2018, Mendis was named in Dambulla's squad for the 2017–18 Super Four Provincial Tournament. The following month, he was also named in Dambulla's squad for the 2018 Super Provincial One Day Tournament.

In August 1998, Mendis was named in Galle's squad the 2018 SLC T20 League. He was the leading run-scorer for Galle in the tournament, with 182 runs in six matches. In March 2019, he was named in Galle's squad for the 2019 Super Provincial One Day Tournament.

During the 2019–20 Premier League Tournament, Mendis scored 139 against Ragama Cricket Club, and the match was won by an innings and 125 runs. Mendis scored his maiden first-class double century against Nondescripts Cricket Club. His unbeaten double century helped to draw the match. In the final match against Chilaw Marians Cricket Club, Mendis scored another century, with 157 runs.

In October 2020, Mendis was drafted by the Kandy Tuskers for the inaugural edition of the Lanka Premier League. In November 2021, he was selected to play for the Galle Gladiators following the players' draft for the 2021 Lanka Premier League. In July 2022, he was signed by the Galle Gladiators for the third edition of the Lanka Premier League.

On 7th February 2023, in SA20 against Paarl Royals, Mendis scored 80 runs from 41 deliveries hitting 8 boundaries and four sixes. Due to his knock Pretoria Capitals won the match by 59 runs and Mendis won player of the match award.

International career

Debut years
Mendis captained Sri Lanka's squad for the 2014 ICC Under-19 Cricket World Cup. He was the 132nd Test player for Sri Lanka, gaining his cap during the second Test of Sobers-Tissera Trophy. He made his Test debut in 2nd Test of West Indies tour of Sri Lanka 2015, scoring 13 runs in the first innings and 39 runs in second innings.

Mendis was named in the Sri Lanka squad for the tour of England, and in the first Test he scored a duck in the first innings, but in the second innings he scored his maiden test half-century with 53 runs.

Mendis made his One Day International (ODI) debut against Ireland on 16 June 2016, scoring his maiden ODI fifty. Mendis made his Twenty20 International (T20I) debut for Sri Lanka against England on 5 July 2016 in the same tour.

Making a mark in international arena
On 28 July 2016, Mendis scored his maiden Test century during the first Test against Australia at the Pallekele Cricket Stadium. He became the youngest Sri Lankan to score a century against Australia and also the highest score against Australia on home soil. Sri Lanka won the match by 106 runs, which was only their second Test win against Australia. Mendis won the Man of the Match award for his performance.

In the fifth match of the Tri-series in Zimbabwe against the West Indies, Mendis scored 94 runs. With his fifty and 94 runs by Niroshan Dickwella, Sri Lanka posted 330 runs off 50 overs, which was recorded as the highest total by Sri Lanka against the West Indies. Sri Lanka won the match by single run and Mendis was adjudged man of the match for his batting. With this win Sri Lanka reached the final with Zimbabwe. In the final, Mendis scored another fifty, guiding the team to win the series by 6 wickets. His all-round performances in the series gave him his first player of the series award.

On the first Test against Bangladesh at Galle, Mendis scored his second Test century, just fall short 6 runs for his double hundred. His score of 194, before he was caught by Tamim Iqbal. On 28 March 2017, in the second ODI against Bangladesh at Rangiri Dambulla International Stadium, Mendis scored his maiden ODI century, with 102 runs. However, the match ended as a no result, due to heavy rain.

On 8 June 2017 against India in 2017 ICC Champions Trophy, Mendis scored a match-winning 89 runs to seal the match for Sri Lanka. In the match, Sri Lanka chased 321 runs scored by India, by recording the highest successful run chase in Champion's Trophy history. He along with Danushka Gunathilaka stood 159-run stand for the second wicket and helped to reach the mark. This was Sri Lanka's joint-highest chase, and their first successful 300-plus chase since the 2015 World Cup as well. On 30 June 2017 against Zimbabwe, Mendis passed 1,000 ODI runs, becoming the joint second-fastest (with Tharanga) for Sri Lanka to achieve this.

During the first Test against Bangladesh in 2018, Mendis scored his fourth Test hundred. His hundred came on the third day of the match, which was on his 23rd birthday. Mendis along with Dhananjaya de Silva scored 308-run partnership to the second wicket until De Silva dismissed for 173 runs. However, Mendis was dismissed for 196 runs, four runs short of his maiden double century just before the tea break. Mendis' career-best score of 196, however, made him the second Sri Lankan after Kumar Sangakkara to get out in the 190s at least twice.

After good performances in Tests against Bangladesh, Mendis was named to the T20I squad for Sri Lanka by replacing injured Kusal Perera. In the first match, he scored a match winning knock of 53 from 27 balls. Bangladesh scored 193 in their 20 overs, which was then their highest T20I total. Mendis opened the innings with Danushka Gunathilaka and they added 53 for the first wicket in just 4.5 overs. Then Mendis scored his first T20I fifty and Sri Lanka won the match by 6 wickets. The chase of 193 is recorded as the highest T20I chase by Sri Lanka as well. Mendis adjudged man of the match, which is his first in T20Is. In the second T20I, Mendis scored another match winning half century and Sri Lanka posted 210 in their 20 overs. This is Sri Lanka's highest T20I score against Bangladesh. Finally Sri Lanka won the match and series 2-0 and Mendis was awarded with both man of the match and player of the series.

In May 2018, he was one of 33 cricketers to be awarded a national contract by Sri Lanka Cricket ahead of the 2018–19 season.

Ups and downs
Mendis was totally out of form during the 2018 Asia Cup, where he was dismissed for naught in both games against Bangladesh and Afghanistan. His place in the team was in doubt with poor performances, where he was omitted from the England tour in Sri Lanka. But during the ODI series, Mendis was called into the squad for the remainder of the series against England, as a replacement for Kusal Perera, who suffered a quad strain in the second ODI. In his comeback match, he was again dismissed for naught. In the fourth ODI, he batted in the middle order and scored only 5 runs and England won the series 3–0. In the last match, Mendis batted in the number-4 position. After 24 innings without a fifty, he scored a 30-ball half century in the match with 6 huge sixes. Sri Lanka won the match by 219 runs in D/L method.

During the first Test against New Zealand in late 2018, Mendis scored his sixth Test century. Mendis along with Angelo Mathews batted all over fourth day, which was the fifth time that Sri Lankan pair had done that in Test history. On the fifth day, they put on an unbeaten double century partnership which overall lasts for 115 wicketless overs for New Zealanders. With rain interrupted, the match was ended in a draw. The partnership of 246, was also Sri Lanka's highest for any wicket against New Zealand and also Sri Lanka's highest in the second innings of a Test. It was the first time a Sri Lankan pair has added 200-plus runs in the second innings of a Test outside Asia.

In the second Test, Mendis reached 1,000 Test runs in the calendar year 2018. He became only the second player after Virat Kohli to achieve the feat. He finished 2018 as the second-highest run-scorer in Test cricket, with 1,023 runs at an average 46.50, including three centuries and four fifties. During the two-match Test series against South Africa, Mendis continued his poor form with bat with scores 0, 12 and 16. However, his fielding efforts at slip improved in each innings. However, in the second innings of the second test at Port Elizabeth, Mendis scored his 9th test fifty. He along with newcomer Oshada Fernando put on an unbeaten partnership of 163 runs off 213 balls to win the match by 8 wicket. Eventually, Sri Lanka won the series 2-0 and Mendis was adjudged man of the match. It was the first Test series won by Sri Lanka in South Africa.

In April 2019, he was named in Sri Lanka's squad for the 2019 Cricket World Cup. On 1 September 2019 during first T20I against New Zealand, he scored quick 79 runs off 53 balls to set a target of 174. However, Sri Lanka lost the match. In the last over of second T20I, he had a collision with Shehan Jayasuriya at the boundary line. Jayasuriya was running from long on, and Mendis from midwicket, in order to intercept an aerial Mitchell Santner, he tripped up by the onrushing Mendis, and sent crashing into the boundary. Both players picked up knee injuries and rested from the third T20I.

During the first Test against Zimbabwe on 19 January 2020, Mendis scored his eleventh fifty. He made 80 runs off 163 deliveries in the match and had a strong partnership with eventual double centurion Angelo Mathews. Sri Lanka went on to win the match by 10 wickets. In the second Test, Mendis scored his seventh century with an unbeaten 116 in the second innings, with Sri Lanka winning the series 1–0.

On 25 February 2020, against the West Indies, Mendis scored his second ODI century. Along with Avishka Fernando, they made a 239-run partnership for the third wicket, with Sri Lanka eventually making 345/8. The West Indies collapsed in the chase and Sri Lanka won the match by 161 runs. This was the biggest win in terms of runs against the West Indies by Sri Lanka in ODIs, with Sri Lanka taking an unassailable lead in the series. On 28 June 2021, Sri Lanka Cricket (SLC) suspended Mendis, Danushka Gunathilaka and Niroshan Dickwella after they breached the team's bio-secure bubble during Sri Lanka's tour of England. All three players were seen in the city centre of Durham, with SLC sending them all back home ahead of the ODI matches. In July 2021, following the outcome of the incident, Mendis was suspended from playing in international cricket for one year. Sri Lanka Cricket agreed to lift the ban early, rescinding the punishment in January 2022.

On 20 February 2022, Mendis scored a match-winning sixth T20I half century against Australia. His unbeaten 69 runs helped Sri Lanka to win the match by five wickets, with him being named the player of the match. On 23 May 2022, he was hospitalized after leaving the field holding his chest minutes before lunch on the first day of the second Test against Bangladesh. The doctors "suspect muscle spasms" as the reason for his discomfort but an ECG test has "come out clear".

In the Australian Test series in July 2022, Sri Lanka suffered a huge defeat, with the match ending in three days. Mendis scored just 3 and 8 runs in the match. However, on 9 July 2022, in the second Test, Mendis scored 85 runs in a partnership of 152 with Dimuth Karunaratne. On 1 September 2022, against Bangladesh Kusal Mendis scored his 7th T20I half century. He scored 60 runs while chasing 183 runs. Finally Sri Lanka won the match and Kusal Mendis won player of the match award for his performance.

During the 2022 Asia Cup, Mendis played as the opener with Pathum Nissanka and they made match-winning partnerships in the games against Bangladesh, Afghanistan and India. Against Bangladesh, Mendis made match-winning knock of 60 runs and Sri Lanka finally chased the target of 183 runs with one wicket. However, Mendis had four clear chances and won by luck. On 6 September 2022 against India, Mendis scored his 8th T20I half century. He scored 57 runs and put strong 97 run partnership with Pathum Nissanka while chasing 173 runs. Finally Sri Lanka won the match by 6 wickets.

First round in T20I world cup 2022, against Netherland, Mendis scored 9th T20I half century. He scored 79 runs in 44 balls hitting five boundaries and five sixes. Finally Sri Lanka won the match by 16 runs and qualified for super 12. Mendis won player of the match award for his performance.

First match in super 12 in T20 World cup 2022, against Ireland, Mendis scored his 10th T20I half century. During that innings he reached 1000 T20I runs too. He scored unbeaten 68 runs hitting five boundaries and three sixes. Finally Sri Lanka won the match by 9 wickets and Mendis won player of the match award.

On 5th January 2023 against India, Mendis scored his 11th T20I half century. He scored 52 runs hitting three boundaries and four sixes. Finally Sri Lanka won the match by 16 runs.
On March 2023 Mendis scored fastest half century against New Zealand in his test career.This is fastest half century at Hagley Oval. Finally Mendis scored 87 of 83 balls.

Personal life
In July 2020, Mendis was arrested after being involved in a fatal road accident in Panadura. Mendis was driving a vehicle that hit an elderly cyclist, who later died in hospital. A day after the incident, Mendis was released on bail. On 12 February 2021, Mendis married his wife in Colombo. In June 2022, Mendis' wife gave birth to a baby girl.

References

External links

1995 births
Alumni of Prince of Wales' College, Moratuwa
Bloomfield Cricket and Athletic Club cricketers
Colombo Cricket Club cricketers
Kurunegala Warriors cricketers
Living people
Moors Sports Club cricketers
Sri Lankan cricketers
Sri Lanka Test cricketers
Sri Lanka One Day International cricketers
Sri Lanka Twenty20 International cricketers
Sportspeople from Moratuwa
Cricketers at the 2019 Cricket World Cup
Kandy Falcons cricketers
Wicket-keepers
Galle Gladiators cricketers